Piller may refer to:

 Piller, a district of the municipality of Fließ, Tyrol, Austria
 Anton Piller order, court order which provides for the right to search premises without prior warning

People
 József Piller (born 1988), Hungarian footballer
 Michael Piller (1948-2005), television scriptwriter and producer
 René Piller (born 1965), French racewalker

See also
 Pillar (disambiguation)
 Peeler (disambiguation)